This is a list of administrators and governors of Akwa Ibom State.
Akwa Ibom State was formed in 1987 when it was split from Cross River State.

See also
States of Nigeria
List of state governors of Nigeria

References

 
Akwa Ibom